Fergana International Airport  is a small airport serving the city of Fergana, the capital city of the Fergana Region in Uzbekistan.

A regiment of Military Transport Aviation was based at the airport during the Soviet period, which became a unit of the Uzbek Air Force.

Facilities

Airlines and destinations

See also
List of the busiest airports in the former USSR
Transportation in Uzbekistan

References

External links
  Fergana Airport at AviaPages.ru (English translation via Google)
Fergana Airport 
 Aeronautical chart for UTKF at SkyVector
 

Airports in Uzbekistan
Fergana Region